is a Japanese former competitive figure skater. From 2002 to 2007, she skated with Jean-Sébastien Fecteau as a pair skater for Canada, winning the silver medal at the 2006 Four Continents Championships. Earlier in her career, she competed in single skating for Japan.

Career 
Until 2002, Wakamatsu competed in single skating for Japan. She competed on the ISU Junior Grand Prix series, winning a bronze medal in 1999 in the Czech Republic, and at one senior Grand Prix event, the 2001 Skate America. She placed as high as fifth on the senior level at the Japan Championships.

In April 2002, Wakamatsu teamed up with Jean-Sébastien Fecteau to compete in pair skating for Canada. In 2003, they won gold medals at the Finlandia Trophy and Nebelhorn Trophy and made their Grand Prix debut. 

In the 2004–05 season, Wakamatsu/Fecteau won silver at the 2005 Canadian Championships and were sent to the 2005 World Championships where they placed eighth.

In the 2005–06 season, the pair won bronze at a Grand Prix event, the 2005 NHK Trophy. They also took bronze at the 2006 Canadian Championships and were sent to the 2006 Four Continents Championships where they won the silver medal.

Wakamatsu announced her retirement from competitive skating on April 24, 2007.

Personal life 
Wakamatsu studied social welfare at Tohoku Fukushi University in Sendai.

Programs

With Fecteau

Single skating

Competitive highlights

Pairs career with Fecteau for Canada

Singles career for Japan

References

External links

 Official site
 

1981 births
Canadian female pair skaters
Japanese female single skaters
Living people
Sportspeople from Aomori Prefecture
Four Continents Figure Skating Championships medalists
Competitors at the 2001 Winter Universiade